Desulfotomaculum halophilum is a halophilic sulfate-reducing bacterium. It is endospore-forming, long, straight to curved rod-shaped and with type strain SEBR 3139T (= DSM 11559T).

References

Further reading

Adams, Michael W., et al., eds. Biochemistry and physiology of anaerobic bacteria. Springer, 2003.

External links
LPSN

Type strain of Desulfotomaculum halophilum at BacDive -  the Bacterial Diversity Metadatabase

Peptococcaceae